Clutha may refer to:
The name of the River Clyde in Latin, from Cumbric (as in Ystrad Clut)
Clutha ferry passenger steamers on the River Clyde in Glasgow from 1884 to 1903
Clutha (dance), a Scottish country dance
The Clutha, a traditional Scottish band
 Clutha River / Mata-Au in New Zealand, named after the Clyde
Clutha District, New Zealand
Clutha County, New Zealand
Clutha, an historic New Zealand electorate
Clutha-Southland, a New Zealand electorate
Balclutha, New Zealand, often abbreviated to Clutha
Inch Clutha, an island sitting in the delta of the Clutha River / Mata-au
The Clutha Vaults, a pub in Glasgow, Scotland, the site of a helicopter crash in 2013